Cats of the Clans is a field guide in the Warriors novel series. The novel itself consists of biographical details and paintings of the most notable cats. The information is given the form of stories told to three StarClan kittens. The narrator is Rock, a mysterious hairless blind cat.

The book has sold more than 150,000 copies.

Plot

In the introductory chapter, "Three Lost Travelers", the kits Mosskit, Adderkit and Blossomkit have somehow walked from their home StarClan, the place where Clan cats go when they die, to Rock's home, in the far unknown. Rock tells the three that they did not live long enough to learn about their Clanmates, so he will answer their questions about the cats they left behind. Rock describes himself as "the keeper of the world beneath the one your former Clanmates walk."

The remainder of the book consists of Rock's stories about each Clan, and descriptions of various cats within the Clans. Rock describes major events in the cats' lives, and often comments on why the cat is special or acted as they did. There are also stories about a few cats from the Tribe of Rushing Water, SkyClan, and BloodClan in addition to some loners and kittypets.

Although Rock, as the narrator, claims neutrality, the book does not treat each Clan equally, devoting more space to ThunderClan cats. This is to be expected, as during the time when the book was published, ThunderClan was the only Clan to have been written as a main Clan.

Format and content 

All text is written in first-person point of view with Rock as the narrator. He is talking to three kits, and often makes direct reference to them.

The introductory chapter is two pages long. Each Clan introductory chapter is also two pages long. These are followed by two-page spreads for each cat (or group of cats) discussed; text is on the left page and a full-color illustration is on the right page.

The Clans and cats described in the book are as follows:

ThunderClan: Firestar, Bluestar, Graystripe and Millie, Sandstorm, Yellowfang, Cinderpelt, Leafpool, Squirrelflight, Brambleclaw, Ashfur, Brightheart and Cloudtail (with an illustration of only Brightheart), Jaypaw, Hollypaw, and Lionpaw.
ShadowClan: Tigerstar, Brokenstar, Blackstar, Tawnypelt, Boulder, and Littlecloud and Runningnose.
WindClan: Tallstar, Onestar, Mudclaw, Crowfeather, Nightcloud and Breezepaw, and Heatherpaw.
RiverClan: Crookedstar, Leopardstar, Graypool, Mistyfoot and Stonefur, Silverstream, Feathertail, Stormfur, Hawkfrost, Mothwing and Willowpaw.
Cats outside the Clans: Ravenpaw and Barley, Princess, and Smudge
Tribe of Rushing Water: Brook Where Small Fish Swim and Talon of Swooping Eagle (with an illustration of only Talon) and Teller of the Pointed Stones
SkyClan: Cloudstar and Skywatcher, Leafstar, Echosong, and Sharpclaw.
BloodClan: Scourge and Bone.
The book also contains four maps (forest illustration, forest diagram, lake illustration, lake diagram) and an excerpt from Eclipse.

Errors 
There are a few mistakes in the book. Scourge of BloodClan is shown with an orange collar, instead of purple. It additionally shows Scourge as a black-and-orange cat, despite the fact that he is a pure black cat (save for his one white paw). The book also erroneously states that Blackfoot was Nightstar’s deputy, but Cinderfur was Nightstar's deputy. Blackfoot served as Brokenstar and Tigerstar's deputy.

Critical reception
A review by School Library Journal praised how the pictures show ferocity of the cats and how "the full-color portraits of these cats are spectacular. They show these characters to be exciting, vibrant, and unique, and will interest new readers much more than the tone-heavy, mysterious musings of the narrator".

References

External links
The official Warriors website

Warriors (novel series)
2008 children's books
2008 American novels
American children's books
Novels about cats
Avon (publisher) books